Gaston Jorré is a judge currently serving on the Tax Court of Canada.

References

Living people
Judges of the Tax Court of Canada
Year of birth missing (living people)